Akemi Sato (also Satō or Satou) may refer to:

, Japanese singer
, Japanese voice actress